Jens Nygård (born 8 January 1978) is a Finnish footballer who represents Vaasan Palloseura of Veikkausliiga.

References
Guardian Football
Vaasan Palloseura

1978 births
Living people
People from Närpes
Finnish footballers
Vaasan Palloseura players
Veikkausliiga players
Närpes Kraft Fotbollsförening players
Association football defenders
Sportspeople from Ostrobothnia (region)